is a 1978 Japanese film directed by Toshiya Fujita.

Synopsis
The story of a high school boy (Toshiyuki Nagashima) in Tokyo returning to his home town of Nagano upon the death of his father.

Cast
 Jun Etō as Ryuzo Kuroiwa
 Toshiyuki Nagashima as Tatsuo Nozaki
 Mayumi Asano as Makiko Takemura
 Kaori Takeda as Yumi Hira

Reception
Kaerazaru hibi was nominated for the Award of the Japanese Academy in 1979 for Best Director and Best Screenplay. Director Toshiya Fujita won the Readers' Choice Award given by Kinema Junpo in 1979 as Best Japanese Film Director for the film.

3rd Hochi Film Awards 
 Won: Best Newcomer - Toshiyuki Nagashima

Availability
The film was released by Nikkatsu on DVD August 6, 2004.

References

External links
 
 

1978 films
Films directed by Toshiya Fujita
Nikkatsu films
1970s Japanese films